This is a list of the former teams of the American Basketball Association (2000–present). This page reflects teams that are either defunct or left the ABA for other leagues.

A
ABA Australia 
ABA Mexico 
Aberdeen Attack
Alaska 49ers
Alaska Dream
Alaska Quake
Alaska Stars 
Albany Shockwave
Albany Thunderdawgs
Albuquerque Aliens
Alexandria Wind Jammers 
Anaheim Roadrunners
Anderson Champions
Aoshen Dragons
Applachian Rapids
Arcata 49ers
Arizona Beast
Arizona Rhinos
Arizona Scorpions
Arkansas Aeros
Arkansas Fantastics
Arkansas RimRockers – joined NBA Development League
Arkansas Rivercatz
Arkansas Scorpions
Atlanta Experience
Atlanta Mustangs
Atlanta Vision
Augusta 706ers
Austin Boom
Austin Capitals

B
Bahama All-Pro Show
Ball World Peace
Baltimore Bay Lions → Baltimore Pearls
Bay Area Matrix
Baytown Bandits
Beijing Aoshen Olympians – joined West Coast Pro Basketball League
Bellevue Blackhawks
Bellevue Nighthawks
Bellingham Slam – joined International Basketball League
Big Valley Shockwave – expansion team that did not begin play in 2006–2007 season 
Birmingham Blitz
Birmingham Magicians
Bluegrass Stallions – joined Premier Basketball League
Bluff City Reign
Boriquen Puerto Rico
Boston Blizzard
Boston Defenders
Boston Liberators 
Bowling Green Bandits
Brooklyn Blackout
Brooklyn Heat
Brooklyn Skyrockets
Buckeye Show 
Buffalo 716ers – joined Premier Basketball League
Buffalo Blue Hawks
Buffalo Germans
Buffalo Sharks
Buffalo Warriors

C

Carolina Cheetahs
Carolina Cougars
Carolina Coyotes
Carolina Destiny
Carolina Jaguars
Carolina Kings
Carolina Thunder
Carson Buzz → Maywood Buzz
Centinelas de Mexicali
Central Cali Cats
Central Coast Chaos
Central Florida Marvel – joined NEBA
 Central Valley Dawgs
Central Valley Titans
Charleston Charcoal
Charleston City Lions
Charlotte Crossovers 
Charlotte Dynasty
Charlotte Krunk – joined Continental Basketball Association → Atlanta Krunk, joined Premier Basketball League → Augusta Groove
Charlotte Rams
Chattanooga Steamers
Chi-Town Bulldogs
Chicago Court Kingz
Chicago Knights
Chicago Rockets
Chicago Rockstars
Chicago Skyliners → Las Vegas Rattlers
Chicago Soldiers – joined Independent Basketball Association 
Chicago Stars
Chicago Steam
Chicago Throwbacks – joined Premier Basketball League
Chico Rage
Cicero Cometas USA
Cincinnati Blaze
Cincinnati Monarchs
Clayton Showtime
Cleveland Rockers
College Park Spyders
Colorado Cougars
Colorado Gray Wolves 
Colorado Kings
Colorado Springs Crusaders
Colorado Storm
Columbia Axemen
Columbus Blackhawks
Columbus Crush
Columbus Life
Columbus Riverballers
Columbus Wolves
Compton Cobras
Connecticut Topballerz
Corning Bulldogs – joined Eastern Basketball Alliance → Elmira Bulldogs
Conway Cyclones
Cypress Express

D
Dallas Generals
Dallas Impact
Daytona Beach Sharks
Delta Storm – joined Elite Basketball League
Denton Destroyers
Detroit Coast II Coast All-Stars
Detroit Dogs 
Detroit Hoops
Detroit Panthers – joined Premier Basketball League
Detroit Zafir
DMV Warriors

E
East Bay Pit Bulls
East Carolina Trojans
East Kentucky Energy
East Kentucky Miners
East Point Jaguars
Edmonton Cheetahs
Electric City Lions → Charleston City Lions  
Everett Evolution
Everett Longshoremen
Everett Revolution

F
Fairfield Funky Fresh
Flint Fire 
Flint-Vehicle City Chargers 
Florida All-Stars
Florida Makos 
Florida Native Pride 
Florida Pit Bulls – joined Continental Basketball Association → East Kentucky Miners, rejoined ABA 
Florida Thundercats
Fort Smith Firebirds
Fort Worth Energy 
Fresno Farmdogs 
Fresno Griffins
Fresno Heatwave → Sacramento Heatwave → California Heatwave
Fresno-Washington Raptors

G
Gallup Talons → Gallup Outlaws
Garland Hoyas – Joined NEBA
Gatos del Miami
Gem City Hall O' Famers
Georgia Bearcats → Georgia Wildcats
Georgia Knights – joined Universal Basketball Association → Georgia Lions
Georgia Razors – joined Continental Basketball League
Georgia Kingz
Georgia Predators
Georgia Roadrunners
Georgia-Lina Hurricanes
Gomez Palacio Thundercats
Grande Prairie Cowboys
Grand Rapids Cyclones
Grand Rapids Danger – joined another league 
Greenville Down East
Greencastle Golden Knights
Greenville Galaxy
Gulf Coast Flash

H
Halifax Rainmen – joined Premier Basketball League, joined National Basketball League of Canada
Hamilton Rockstars
Hammond Rollers
Hampton Charters
Hampton Roads Sharks
Hampton Roads Stallions
Hampton Roads Titans
Hampton Street Pros
Harbor Shore Dreams
Harlem Revs
Hartford Hurricanes
Hattiesburg Hornets
Hawaii Hammerheads
Hawaii Hurricanes
Hawaii Mega Force
Heartland Heat
Heartland Prowl – joined Continental Basketball League, joined Florida Basketball Association
Henderson All-Starz
Hermosillo Seris
Hollywood Fame
Hollywood Magic
Hollywood Showstoppers
Honolulu Pegasus → Cypress Pegasus
Houston Hounddogs 
Houston Undertakers → Houston Takers → Houston Red Storm
Hub City Warriors

I
Ill City Beast
Illinois BallDogz
Indiana Alley Cats – joined Continental Basketball Association
Indiana Diesels – joined Premier Basketball League
Indiana Legends
Indiana State Warriors
Indianapolis Drive
Indy Naptown All-Stars
Inglewood Cobras
Inland Empire 5LINX
Inland Empire Invaders → Yuma Invaders

J
Jacksonville Jackals
Jacksonville JAM – joined Premier Basketball League
Jacksonville Bluewaves
Jacksonville Giants
Jacksonville Wave
Jersey Jaguars
Juarez Gallos

K
Kalamazoo Pure → Kalamazoo Cobras → Kalamazoo Giant Knights
Kansas Kagerz 
Kansas City Knights
Kansas City Soul
Kansas City Spartans
Kansas City Stars
Katy Katz
KC Clubbin 
Kent Chiefs 
Kentucky Bisons
Kentucky Enforcers
Kentucky Mavericks
Kentucky Pro Cats
Kentucky Retros
King County Rampage
King County Royals
Kitsap Admirals – became independent team 
Knoxville Colonels
Knoxville Noise
Knoxville Warriors

L
Lake Charles Corsairs – expansion team that did not begin play in 2012–2013 season
Lake Charles Hurricanes – expansion team that did not begin play
Lake City Kingdom Riders → Gulf Coast Kingdom Riders → Louisiana Kingdom Riders
Lake Erie Rockers
Lake Michigan Admirals – joined Premier Basketball League
Lakewood Panthers
Lancaster Wolfpack
Lansing Law
Lansing Sting
Laredo Swarm → Am-Mex Swarm → Cen-Tex Swarm 
Las Estrellas de Chicago (Chicago Stars)
Las Vegas Aces
Las Vegas Defenders 
Las Vegas Jokers 
Las Vegas Knights
Las Vegas PROLYMs
Las Vegas Rattlers
Las Vegas Wizards
Libertyville Vipers → Vipers Pro Basketball
Lima Explosion – joined Premier Basketball League → Lima Express
Lincoln Thunder
Little Italy Buffaloes
Little Rock Lightning
LI Whoshoseballers
Long Beach Breakers
Long Beach Jam – joined NBA Development League → Bakersfield Jam → Northern Arizona Suns → Motor City Cruise
Long Beach Laguneros
Long Island Sounders
Los Angeles Aftershock
Los Angeles Palms
Los Angeles Push
Los Angeles Slam
Los Angeles Slam of Antelope Valley 
Los Angeles Stars
Los Borregos Tecate
Los Diablos Tijuana 
Louisiana Cajun All Stars
Louisiana Cajun Pelicans
Louisiana Gators
Louisiana Kingdom Riders
Louisiana Soul – joined Universal Basketball Association
Louisiana United

M
Manchester Millrats – joined Premier Basketball League, joined National Basketball League of Canada → Saint John Mill Rats
Maryland Marvels – joined Eastern Basketball Alliance
Maryland Nighthawks – joined Premier Basketball League, joined Atlantic Coast Professional Basketball League → Washington GreenHawks
Mayas-USA
Memphis Dons
Memphis Houn'Dawgs
Metroplex Lightning
Miami Flame
Miami Midnites
Miami Storm
Miami Tropics
Michiana Ballaholix
Mid-South Echoes
Midwest Flames
Milwaukee Blast
Milwaukee RimRattlers
Minnesota Blizzards
Minnesota Rattlers
Minnesota Ripknees
Minnesota Slamma Jamma
Minot City Freeze
Mississippi Blues
Mississippi Miracles
Missouri Rhythm → Kansas City Soul
Mobile Bay Hurricanes
Mobile Bay Tornados
Modesto Bearcats
Modesto Hawks
Monroe Magicians
Montreal Matrix
Motown Jammers

N
Nashville Broncs → Music City Stars
Nashville Nighthawks
Nashville Rhythm
Nashville Soul
Native America
Native Pride
NEA Swag
Nevada Senators
New England Anchors → Providence Anchors
New England Outtatowners 
New Mexico Style
New Orleans Blues/Louisiana Blues – expansion team that did not begin play in 2006–2007 season
New Orleans Cougars
New York Court Kings
New York Jamm
New York Lightning
 
New York Red Riders
New York State Jaguars 
Niagara Daredevils
NorCal Bears
Norfolk Ballerz
Norfolk Navigators
Norfolk Sharks
North Carolina Renegades
North Dallas Vandals
North Shore Tides
North Texas Fresh – joined Universal Basketball Association
Northeast Pennsylvania Breakers – joined United States Basketball League
Northern Indiana Monarchs → Michiana Monarchs → King City Monarchs → Southern Illinois Monarchs 
Northwestern Indiana Magical Stars – joined Premier Basketball League → Northwest Indiana Stars
NoVA Wonders
NYC Internationalz
NYC Thunder

O
Oakland Bayhawks → Oakland TownHawks
Oceanside A-Team
Ohio Aviators
Oklahoma Cavalry - joined Continental Basketball Association → Lawton-Fort Sill Cavalry, joined Premier Basketball League
Oklahoma City Ballhawgs → Louisiana Cajun Pelicans
Oklahoma Stallions
Olympia Rise 
Ontario Red Wolves
Ontario Warriors
Orange County Buzz
Orange County Crush → Orange County Buzz → Carson Buzz → Maywood Buzz
Orange County Gladiators
Orlando Kings
Orlando Waves
Outtatowners of New York City
Owensboro Colonels

P
Pacific Rim Rockers
Palm Beach Imperials
Palmetto State Rizers
Panama City Dream
Pee Dee Pride
Pensacola Aviators
Peoria Kings
Peoria Pride
Permian Basin Obvious Culture 
Philadelphia Cannon
Philadelphia Colonials
Philadelphia Fusion
Philadelphia Sounds
Philadelphia Spirit
Phoenix City Bombers
Phoenix Eclipse
Phoenix Fury
Pittsburgh Hardhats
Pittsburgh Patriots
Pittsburgh Phantoms 
Pittsburgh Xplosion – joined Continental Basketball Association
Plano Mighty Kings
Polk County Flame
Port City Pirates
Port City Tornadoes
Porter County Punishers → Indiana State Warriors
Portsmouth Cavaliers – joined American Professional Basketball League
Portland Reign
Pottstown Flames
Pennsylvania Pride
Pro Elite Flyers
Providence Sky Chiefs → Providence Anchors – joined Premier Basketball League
Puro Money

Q
Quad City Riverhawks – joined Premier Basketball League
Quebec Kebs – joined Premier Basketball League, joined National Basketball League of Canada → Laval Kebs
Queens Kings

R
Raleigh Renegades
Reading Railers – joined Premier Basketball League, folded
Reading Wizards
Reigning Knights of Georgia
Reno Rockers
Reno Sharpshooters
Richmond Generals
Richmond Rockets
Rio Grande Valley Silverados → Southeast Texas Mavericks → Shreveport-Bossier Mavericks
Riverside Rainmakers
Riverside Rage
Rochester Fire 
Rochester Ravens →  
Rochester Razorsharks – joined Premier Basketball League
Rockford Riverdawgs – joined Independent Basketball Association
Rock River Fury – joined Premier Basketball League → Rockford Fury
Rocky Mountain Stampede
Rome Legions
Roswell Grays

S
Sacramento KnightCats
Salem Sabres
Salem Storm
Salina Saints 
Salt Lake City Saints
Salt Lake Dream
San Antonio Stallions
San Diego B-Kings
San Diego Guardians - joined another league
San Diego Sol
San Diego Wildcats
San Diego Wildfire
San Francisco Pilots
San Francisco Rumble
San Jose SkyRockets – joined Continental Basketball Association → Minot SkyRockets
Schertz Kings – joined NEBA
Scranton Shamrock
Seattle Zhen Gan
Shreveport-Bossier Flight
Shreveport-Bossier Mavericks – joined Premier Basketball League → Kentucky Mavericks
Silver Springs Barracudas
Sioux City Hornets
Smoky Mountain Jam
SoCal Legends – joined Continental Basketball Association
SoCal Surf
Sonora Mexicanos 
South Carolina Warriors
South Jersey Knights
South Houston Assault
South Texas Showboats → Texas Fuel
South Texas Stingrays
South Valley Fever
Southcoast Fire
Southern Alabama Bounce
Southern California Surf
Southern Kansas Thunder 
Southwest Florida Spartans
Spokane Sunz
Springfield Sting → Western Mass Zombies
St. Louis Flight
St. Louis Rotweilers
St. Louis Stunners
Stanislaus County Super Kats 
Staten Island Vipers
Strong Island Sound
Sugar Land Legends
Syracuse Raging Bullz → Rochester Raging Bullz
Syracuse Shockwave

T
Tacoma Navigators
Tacoma Rise → Olympia Rise
Tampa Bay Rain
Tampa Bay Sharks
Tampa Bay Strong Dogs
Tampa Bay ThunderDawgs
Tampa Bay Tornadoes
Team Haiti
Team Nicaragua 
Tennessee Halo's
Tennessee Mad Hatters
Tennessee Mud Frogs
Texarkana Panthers
Texas Cagerz 
Texas Cardinals
Texas City Rangers
Texas Fuel
Texas Hurricanes 
Texas Red Wolves
Texas Skyriders 
Texas Tycoons
The City Jazz 
Dragones de Tijuana (Tijuana Dragons)
Toledo Royal Knights
Topeka Aviators → Topeka Steel → Kansas City Steel
Trenton Cagers 
Tri-City Racers
Tri-City Suns
Tucson Buckets 
Tulsa Twisters
Turley 66ers 
Twin City Ballers

U
Universal City Seraphim 
Utah Avalanche
Utah Snowbears
Utah Stars

V

W
Waco Wranglers – joined United Basketball League → Texas Wranglers
Washington Internationals
Washington Rampage
Washington Raptors
Washington (NJ) Senators
Washington Swarm
Weirton Widowmakers
Westchester Wildcats
West Chicago Wind
West Texas Whirlwinds
West Virginia Blazers
West Virginia Outlaws
West Virginia Wild
West Virginia Wildcatz → Twin City Jazz
Westchester Phantoms
Wichita Falls
William Tucker University Freedom Eagles 
Wilmington Sea Dawgs – joined Premier Basketball League, joined Continental Basketball League, joined Tobacco Road Basketball League
Wind River Bison → Siouxland Bison
Windy City Monsters – joined Independent Basketball Association → Windy City Blazers
Winston-Salem Storm
Worcester 78s
Wyoming Roughnecks

Y
 Yakima Vipers
 Youngstown Swish
 Yuba City Gold Miners
 Yuma Invaders

References